Eric Arthur Blair (25 June 1903 – 21 January 1950), better known by his pen name George Orwell, was an English novelist, essayist, journalist, and critic. His work is characterised by lucid prose, social criticism, opposition to totalitarianism, and support of democratic socialism.

Orwell produced literary criticism, poetry, fiction and polemical journalism. He is known for the allegorical novella Animal Farm (1945) and the dystopian novel Nineteen Eighty-Four (1949). His non-fiction works, including The Road to Wigan Pier (1937), documenting his experience of working-class life in the industrial north of England, and Homage to Catalonia (1938), an account of his experiences soldiering for the Republican faction of the Spanish Civil War (1936–1939), are as critically respected as his essays on politics, literature, language and culture.

Blair was born in India, and raised and educated in England. After school he became an Imperial policeman in Burma, before returning to Suffolk, England, where he began his writing career as George Orwell—a name inspired by a favourite location, the River Orwell. He lived from occasional pieces of journalism, and also worked as a teacher or bookseller whilst living in London. From the late 1920s to the early 1930s, his success as a writer grew and his first books were published. He was wounded fighting in the Spanish Civil War, leading to his first period of ill health on return to England. During the Second World War he worked as a journalist and for the BBC. The publication of Animal Farm led to fame during his lifetime. During the final years of his life he worked on Nineteen Eighty-Four, and moved between Jura in Scotland and London. It was published in June 1949, less than a year before his death.

Orwell's work remains influential in popular culture and in political culture, and the adjective "Orwellian"—describing totalitarian and authoritarian social practices—is part of the English language, like many of his neologisms, such as "Big Brother", "Thought Police", "Room 101", "Newspeak", "memory hole", "doublethink", and "thoughtcrime". In 2008, The Times ranked George Orwell second among "The 50 greatest British writers since 1945".

Life

Early years

Eric Arthur Blair was born on 25 June 1903 in Motihari, Bengal, British India into what he described as a "lower-upper-middle class" family. His great-grandfather, Charles Blair, was a wealthy country gentleman and absentee owner of Jamaican plantations from Dorset who married Lady Mary Fane, daughter of the 8th Earl of Westmorland. His grandfather, Thomas Richard Arthur Blair, was an Anglican clergyman. Orwell's father was Richard Walmesley Blair, who worked as a Sub-Deputy Opium Agent in the Opium Department of the Indian Civil Service, overseeing the production and storage of opium for sale to China. His mother, Ida Mabel Blair (née Limouzin), grew up in Moulmein, Burma, where her French father was involved in speculative ventures. Eric had two sisters: Marjorie, five years older; and Avril, five years younger. When Eric was one year old, his mother took him and Marjorie to England. In 2014 restoration work began on Orwell's birthplace and ancestral house in Motihari.

In 1904, Ida Blair settled with her children at Henley-on-Thames in Oxfordshire. Eric was brought up in the company of his mother and sisters and, apart from a brief visit in mid-1907, he did not see his father until 1912. Aged five, Eric was sent as a day-boy to a convent school in Henley-on-Thames, which Marjorie also attended. It was a Roman Catholic convent run by French Ursuline nuns. His mother wanted him to have a public school education, but his family could not afford the fees. Through the social connections of Ida Blair's brother Charles Limouzin, Blair gained a scholarship to St Cyprian's School, Eastbourne, East Sussex. Arriving in September 1911, he boarded at the school for the next five years, returning home only for school holidays. Although he knew nothing of the reduced fees, he "soon recognised that he was from a poorer home". Blair hated the school and many years later wrote an essay "Such, Such Were the Joys", published posthumously, based on his time there. At St Cyprian's, Blair first met Cyril Connolly, who became a writer and who, as the editor of Horizon, published several of Orwell's essays.

When they first met, he was standing on his head in a field. Asked why, he said, "You are noticed more if you stand on your head than if you are right way up." Jacintha and Eric read and wrote poetry, and dreamed of becoming famous writers. He said that he might write a book in the style of H. G. Wells's A Modern Utopia. During this period, he also enjoyed shooting, fishing and birdwatching with Jacintha's brother and sister.

While at St Cyprian's, Blair wrote two poems that were published in the Henley and South Oxfordshire Standard. He came second to Connolly in the Harrow History Prize, had his work praised by the school's external examiner, and earned scholarships to Wellington and Eton. But inclusion on the Eton scholarship roll did not guarantee a place, and none was immediately available for Blair. He chose to stay at St Cyprian's until December 1916, in case a place at Eton became available.

In January, Blair took up the place at Wellington, where he spent the Spring term. In May 1917 a place became available as a King's Scholar at Eton. At this time the family lived at Mall Chambers, Notting Hill Gate. Blair remained at Eton until December 1921, when he left midway between his 18th and 19th birthday. Wellington was "beastly", Blair told Jacintha, but he said he was "interested and happy" at Eton. His principal tutor was A. S. F. Gow, Fellow of Trinity College, Cambridge, who also gave him advice later in his career. Blair was briefly taught French by Aldous Huxley. Cyril Connolly followed Blair to Eton, but because they were in separate years, they did not associate with each other.

Blair's academic performance reports suggest that he neglected his studies, but during his time at Eton he worked with Roger Mynors to produce a college magazine, The Election Times, joined in the production of other publications—College Days and Bubble and Squeak—and participated in the Eton Wall Game. His parents could not afford to send him to a university without another scholarship, and they concluded from his poor results that he would not be able to win one. Runciman noted that he had a romantic idea about the East, and the family decided that Blair should join the Imperial Police, the precursor of the Indian Police Service. For this he had to pass an entrance examination. In December 1921 he left Eton and travelled to join his retired father, mother, and younger sister Avril, who that month had moved to 40 Stradbroke Road, Southwold, Suffolk, the first of their four homes in the town. Blair was enrolled at a crammer there called Craighurst, and brushed up on his Classics, English, and History. He passed the entrance exam, coming seventh out of the 26 candidates who exceeded the pass mark.

Policing in Burma

Blair's maternal grandmother lived at Moulmein, so he chose a posting in Burma, then still a province of British India. In October 1922 he sailed on board SS Herefordshire via the Suez Canal and Ceylon to join the Indian Imperial Police in Burma. A month later, he arrived at Rangoon and travelled to the police training school in Mandalay. He was appointed an Assistant District Superintendent (on probation) on 29 November 1922, with effect from 27 November and at the pay of Rs. 525 per month. After a short posting at Maymyo, Burma's principal hill station, he was posted to the frontier outpost of Myaungmya in the Irrawaddy Delta at the beginning of 1924.

Working as an imperial police officer gave him considerable responsibility while most of his contemporaries were still at university in England. When he was posted farther east in the Delta to Twante as a sub-divisional officer, he was responsible for the security of some 200,000 people. At the end of 1924, he was posted to Syriam, closer to Rangoon. Syriam had the refinery of the Burmah Oil Company, "the surrounding land a barren waste, all vegetation killed off by the fumes of sulphur dioxide pouring out day and night from the stacks of the refinery." But the town was near Rangoon, a cosmopolitan seaport, and Blair went into the city as often as he could, "to browse in a bookshop; to eat well-cooked food; to get away from the boring routine of police life". In September 1925 he went to Insein, the home of Insein Prison, the second largest prison in Burma. In Insein, he had "long talks on every conceivable subject" with Elisa Maria Langford-Rae (who later married Kazi Lhendup Dorjee). She noted his "sense of utter fairness in minutest details". By this time, Blair had completed his training and was receiving a monthly salary of Rs. 740, including allowances.

Blair recalled he faced hostility from the Burmese, "in the end the sneering yellow faces of young men that met me everywhere, the insults hooted after me when I was at a safe distance, got badly on my nerves". He recalled that "I was stuck between my hatred of the empire I served and my rage against the evil-spirited little beasts who tried to make my job impossible".

In Burma, Blair acquired a reputation as an outsider. He spent much of his time alone, reading or pursuing non-pukka activities, such as attending the churches of the Karen ethnic group. A colleague, Roger Beadon, recalled (in a 1969 recording for the BBC) that Blair was fast to learn the language and that before he left Burma, "was able to speak fluently with Burmese priests in 'very high-flown Burmese'." Blair made changes to his appearance in Burma that remained for the rest of his life, including adopting a pencil moustache. Emma Larkin writes in the introduction to Burmese Days, "While in Burma, he acquired a moustache similar to those worn by officers of the British regiments stationed there. [He] also acquired some tattoos; on each knuckle he had a small untidy blue circle. Many Burmese living in rural areas still sport tattoos like this—they are believed to protect against bullets and snake bites."

In April 1926 he moved to Moulmein, where his maternal grandmother lived. At the end of that year, he was assigned to Katha in Upper Burma, where he contracted dengue fever in 1927. Entitled to a leave in England that year, he was allowed to return in July due to his illness. While on leave in England and on holiday with his family in Cornwall in September 1927, he reappraised his life. Deciding against returning to Burma, he resigned from the Indian Imperial Police to become a writer, with effect from 12 March 1928 after five-and-a-half years of service. He drew on his experiences in the Burma police for the novel Burmese Days (1934) and the essays "A Hanging" (1931) and "Shooting an Elephant" (1936).

London and Paris

In England, he settled back in the family home at Southwold, renewing acquaintance with local friends and attending an Old Etonian dinner. He visited his old tutor Gow at Cambridge for advice on becoming a writer. In 1927 he moved to London. Ruth Pitter, a family acquaintance, helped him find lodgings, and by the end of 1927 he had moved into rooms in Portobello Road; a blue plaque commemorates his residence there. Pitter's involvement in the move "would have lent it a reassuring respectability in Mrs. Blair's eyes." Pitter had a sympathetic interest in Blair's writing, pointed out weaknesses in his poetry, and advised him to write about what he knew. In fact he decided to write of "certain aspects of the present that he set out to know" and ventured into the East End of London—the first of the occasional sorties he would make to discover for himself the world of poverty and the down-and-outers who inhabit it. He had found a subject. These sorties, explorations, expeditions, tours or immersions were made intermittently over a period of five years.

In imitation of Jack London, whose writing he admired (particularly The People of the Abyss), Blair started to explore the poorer parts of London. On his first outing he set out to Limehouse Causeway, spending his first night in a common lodging house, possibly George Levy's "kip". For a while he "went native" in his own country, dressing like a tramp, adopting the name P.S. Burton and making no concessions to middle-class mores and expectations; he recorded his experiences of the low life for use in "The Spike", his first published essay in English, and in the second half of his first book, Down and Out in Paris and London (1933).

In early 1928 he moved to Paris. He lived in the rue du Pot de Fer, a working class district in the 5th arrondissement. His aunt Nellie Limouzin also lived in Paris and gave him social and, when necessary, financial support. He began to write novels, including an early version of Burmese Days, but nothing else survives from that period. He was more successful as a journalist and published articles in Monde, a political/literary journal edited by Henri Barbusse (his first article as a professional writer, "La Censure en Angleterre", appeared in that journal on 6 October 1928); G. K.'s Weekly, where his first article to appear in England, "A Farthing Newspaper", was printed on 29 December 1928; and Le Progrès Civique (founded by the left-wing coalition Le Cartel des Gauches). Three pieces appeared in successive weeks in Le Progrès Civique: discussing unemployment, a day in the life of a tramp, and the beggars of London, respectively. "In one or another of its destructive forms, poverty was to become his obsessive subject—at the heart of almost everything he wrote until Homage to Catalonia."

He fell seriously ill in February 1929 and was taken to the Hôpital Cochin in the 14th arrondissement, a free hospital where medical students were trained. His experiences there were the basis of his essay "How the Poor Die", published in 1946. He chose not to identify the hospital, and indeed was deliberately misleading about its location. Shortly afterwards, he had all his money stolen from his lodging house. Whether through necessity or to collect material, he undertook menial jobs such as dishwashing in a fashionable hotel on the rue de Rivoli, which he later described in Down and Out in Paris and London. In August 1929, he sent a copy of "The Spike" to John Middleton Murry's New Adelphi magazine in London. The magazine was edited by Max Plowman and Sir Richard Rees, and Plowman accepted the work for publication.

Southwold

In December 1929 after nearly two years in Paris, Blair returned to England and went directly to his parents' house in Southwold, a coastal town in Suffolk, which remained his base for the next five years. The family was well established in the town, and his sister Avril was running a tea-house there. He became acquainted with many local people, including Brenda Salkeld, the clergyman's daughter who worked as a gym-teacher at St Felix Girls' School in the town. Although Salkeld rejected his offer of marriage, she remained a friend and regular correspondent for many years. He also renewed friendships with older friends, such as Dennis Collings, whose girlfriend Eleanor Jacques was also to play a part in his life.

In early 1930 he stayed briefly in Bramley, Leeds, with his sister Marjorie and her husband Humphrey Dakin, who was as unappreciative of Blair as when they knew each other as children. Blair was writing reviews for Adelphi and acting as a private tutor to a disabled child at Southwold. He then became tutor to three young brothers, one of whom, Richard Peters, later became a distinguished academic. "His history in these years is marked by dualities and contrasts. There is Blair leading a respectable, outwardly eventless life at his parents' house in Southwold, writing; then in contrast, there is Blair as Burton (the name he used in his down-and-out episodes) in search of experience in the kips and spikes, in the East End, on the road, and in the hop fields of Kent." He went painting and bathing on the beach, and there he met Mabel and Francis Fierz, who later influenced his career. Over the next year he visited them in London, often meeting their friend Max Plowman. He also often stayed at the homes of Ruth Pitter and Richard Rees, where he could "change" for his sporadic tramping expeditions. One of his jobs was domestic work at a lodgings for half a crown (two shillings and sixpence, or one-eighth of a pound) a day.

Blair now contributed regularly to Adelphi, with "A Hanging" appearing in August 1931. From August to September 1931 his explorations of poverty continued, and, like the protagonist of A Clergyman's Daughter, he followed the East End tradition of working in the Kent hop fields. He kept a diary about his experiences there. Afterwards, he lodged in the Tooley Street kip, but could not stand it for long, and with financial help from his parents moved to Windsor Street, where he stayed until Christmas. "Hop Picking", by Eric Blair, appeared in the October 1931 issue of New Statesman, whose editorial staff included his old friend Cyril Connolly. Mabel Fierz put him in contact with Leonard Moore, who became his literary agent in April 1932.

At this time Jonathan Cape rejected A Scullion's Diary, the first version of Down and Out. On the advice of Richard Rees, he offered it to Faber and Faber, but their editorial director, T. S. Eliot, also rejected it. Blair ended the year by deliberately getting himself arrested, so that he could experience Christmas in prison, but after he was picked up and taken to Bethnal Green police station in the East End of London the authorities did not regard his "drunk and disorderly" behaviour as imprisonable, and after two days in a cell he returned home to Southwold.

Teaching career

In April 1932 Blair became a teacher at The Hawthorns High School, a school for boys, in Hayes, West London. This was a small school offering private schooling for children of local tradesmen and shopkeepers, and had only 14 or 16 boys aged between ten and sixteen, and one other master. While at the school he became friendly with the curate of the local parish church and became involved with activities there. Mabel Fierz had pursued matters with Moore, and at the end of June 1932, Moore told Blair that Victor Gollancz was prepared to publish A Scullion's Diary for a £40 advance, through his recently founded publishing house, Victor Gollancz Ltd, which was an outlet for radical and socialist works.

At the end of the summer term in 1932, Blair returned to Southwold, where his parents had used a legacy to buy their own home. Blair and his sister Avril spent the holidays making the house habitable while he also worked on Burmese Days. He was also spending time with Eleanor Jacques, but her attachment to Dennis Collings remained an obstacle to his hopes of a more serious relationship.

"Clink", an essay describing his failed attempt to get sent to prison, appeared in the August 1932 number of Adelphi. He returned to teaching at Hayes and prepared for the publication of his book, now known as Down and Out in Paris and London. He wished to publish under a different name to avoid any embarrassment to his family over his time as a "tramp". In a letter to Moore (dated 15 November 1932), he left the choice of pseudonym to Moore and to Gollancz. Four days later, he wrote to Moore, suggesting the pseudonyms P. S. Burton (a name he used when tramping), Kenneth Miles, George Orwell, and H. Lewis Allways. He finally adopted the pen name George Orwell because "It is a good round English name." The name George was inspired by the patron saint of England, and Orwell after the River Orwell in Suffolk which was one of Orwell's favourite locations.

Down and Out in Paris and London was published by Victor Gollancz in London on 9 January 1933 and received favourable reviews, with Cecil Day-Lewis complimenting Orwell's "clarity and good sense", and The Times Literary Supplement comparing Orwell's eccentric characters to the characters of Dickens. Down and Out was modestly successful and was next published by Harper & Brothers in New York.

In mid-1933 Blair left Hawthorns to become a teacher at Frays College, in Uxbridge, west London. This was a much larger establishment with 200 pupils and a full complement of staff. He acquired a motorcycle and took trips through the surrounding countryside. On one of these expeditions he became soaked and caught a chill that developed into pneumonia. He was taken to a cottage hospital in Uxbridge, where for a time his life was believed to be in danger. When he was discharged in January 1934, he returned to Southwold to convalesce and, supported by his parents, never returned to teaching.

He was disappointed when Gollancz turned down Burmese Days, mainly on the grounds of potential suits for libel, but Harper were prepared to publish it in the United States. Meanwhile, Blair started work on the novel A Clergyman's Daughter, drawing upon his life as a teacher and on life in Southwold. Eleanor Jacques was now married and had gone to Singapore and Brenda Salkeld had left for Ireland, so Blair was relatively isolated in Southwold—working on the allotments, walking alone and spending time with his father. Eventually in October, after sending A Clergyman's Daughter to Moore, he left for London to take a job that had been found for him by his aunt Nellie Limouzin.

Hampstead

This job was as a part-time assistant in Booklovers' Corner, a second-hand bookshop in Hampstead run by Francis and Myfanwy Westrope, who were friends of Nellie Limouzin in the Esperanto movement. The Westropes were friendly and provided him with comfortable accommodation at Warwick Mansions, Pond Street. He was sharing the job with Jon Kimche, who also lived with the Westropes. Blair worked at the shop in the afternoons and had his mornings free to write and his evenings free to socialise. These experiences provided background for the novel Keep the Aspidistra Flying (1936). As well as the various guests of the Westropes, he was able to enjoy the company of Richard Rees and the Adelphi writers and Mabel Fierz. The Westropes and Kimche were members of the Independent Labour Party, although at this time Blair was not seriously politically active. He was writing for the Adelphi and preparing A Clergyman's Daughter and Burmese Days for publication.

At the beginning of 1935 he had to move out of Warwick Mansions, and Mabel Fierz found him a flat in Parliament Hill. A Clergyman's Daughter was published on 11 March 1935. In early 1935 Blair met his future wife Eileen O'Shaughnessy, when his landlady, Rosalind Obermeyer, who was studying for a master's degree in psychology at University College London, invited some of her fellow students to a party. One of these students, Elizaveta Fen, a biographer and future translator of Chekhov, recalled Blair and his friend Richard Rees "draped" at the fireplace, looking, she thought, "moth-eaten and prematurely aged." Around this time, Blair had started to write reviews for The New English Weekly.

In June, Burmese Days was published and Cyril Connolly's positive review in the New Statesman prompted Blair to re-establish contact with his old friend. In August, he moved into a flat, at 50 Lawford Road, Kentish Town, which he shared with Michael Sayers and Rayner Heppenstall. The relationship was sometimes awkward and Blair and Heppenstall even came to blows, though they remained friends and later worked together on BBC broadcasts. Blair was now working on Keep the Aspidistra Flying, and also tried unsuccessfully to write a serial for the News Chronicle. By October 1935 his flatmates had moved out and he was struggling to pay the rent on his own. He remained until the end of January 1936, when he stopped working at Booklovers' Corner. In 1980, English Heritage honoured Orwell with a blue plaque at his Kentish Town residence.

The Road to Wigan Pier

At this time, Victor Gollancz suggested Orwell spend a short time investigating social conditions in economically depressed Northern England. Two years earlier, J. B. Priestley had written about England north of the Trent, sparking an interest in reportage. The Depression had also introduced a number of working-class writers from the North of England to the reading public. It was one of these working-class authors, Jack Hilton, whom Orwell sought for advice. Orwell had written to Hilton seeking lodging and asking for recommendations on his route. Hilton was unable to provide him lodging, but suggested that he travel to Wigan rather than Rochdale, "for there are the colliers and they're good stuff."

On 31 January 1936, Orwell set out by public transport and on foot, reaching Manchester via Coventry, Stafford, the Potteries and Macclesfield. Arriving in Manchester after the banks had closed, he had to stay in a common lodging-house. The next day he picked up a list of contacts sent by Richard Rees. One of these, the trade union official Frank Meade, suggested Wigan, where Orwell spent February staying in dirty lodgings over a tripe shop. At Wigan, he visited many homes to see how people lived, took detailed notes of housing conditions and wages earned, went down Bryn Hall coal mine, and used the local public library to consult public health records and reports on working conditions in mines.

During this time, he was distracted by concerns about style and possible libel in Keep the Aspidistra Flying. He made a quick visit to Liverpool and during March, stayed in south Yorkshire, spending time in Sheffield and Barnsley. As well as visiting mines, including Grimethorpe, and observing social conditions, he attended meetings of the Communist Party and of Oswald Mosley ("his speech the usual claptrap—The blame for everything was put upon mysterious international gangs of Jews") where he saw the tactics of the Blackshirts ("...one is liable to get both a hammering and a fine for asking a question which Mosley finds it difficult to answer."). He also made visits to his sister at Headingley, during which he visited the Brontë Parsonage at Haworth, where he was "chiefly impressed by a pair of Charlotte Brontë's cloth-topped boots, very small, with square toes and lacing up at the sides."

Orwell needed somewhere he could concentrate on writing his book, and once again help was provided by Aunt Nellie, who was living at Wallington, Hertfordshire in a very small 16th-century cottage called the "Stores". Wallington was a tiny village 35 miles north of London, and the cottage had almost no modern facilities. Orwell took over the tenancy and moved in on 2 April 1936. He started work on The Road to Wigan Pier by the end of April, but also spent hours working on the garden, planting a rose garden which is still extant, and revealing four years later that "outside my work the thing I care most about is gardening, especially vegetable gardening". He also tested the possibility of reopening the Stores as a village shop. Keep the Aspidistra Flying was published by Gollancz on 20 April 1936. On 4 August, Orwell gave a talk at the Adelphi Summer School held at Langham, entitled An Outsider Sees the Distressed Areas; others who spoke at the school included John Strachey, Max Plowman, Karl Polanyi and Reinhold Niebuhr.

The result of his journeys through the north was The Road to Wigan Pier, published by Gollancz for the Left Book Club in 1937. The first half of the book documents his social investigations of Lancashire and Yorkshire, including an evocative description of working life in the coal mines. The second half is a long essay on his upbringing and the development of his political conscience, which includes an argument for socialism (although he goes to lengths to balance the concerns and goals of socialism with the barriers it faced from the movement's own advocates at the time, such as "priggish" and "dull" socialist intellectuals and "proletarian" socialists with little grasp of the actual ideology). Gollancz feared the second half would offend readers and added a disculpatory preface to the book while Orwell was in Spain.

Orwell's research for The Road to Wigan Pier led to him being placed under surveillance by the Special Branch from 1936, for 12 years, until one year before the publication of Nineteen Eighty-Four.

Orwell married Eileen O'Shaughnessy on 9 June 1936. Shortly afterwards, the political crisis began in Spain and Orwell followed developments there closely. At the end of the year, concerned by Francisco Franco's military uprising (supported by Nazi Germany, Fascist Italy and local groups such as Falange), Orwell decided to go to Spain to take part in the Spanish Civil War on the Republican side. Under the erroneous impression that he needed papers from some left-wing organisation to cross the frontier, on John Strachey's recommendation he applied unsuccessfully to Harry Pollitt, leader of the British Communist Party. Pollitt was suspicious of Orwell's political reliability; he asked him whether he would undertake to join the International Brigade and advised him to get a safe-conduct from the Spanish Embassy in Paris. Not wishing to commit himself until he had seen the situation in situ, Orwell instead used his Independent Labour Party contacts to get a letter of introduction to John McNair in Barcelona.

Spanish Civil War

Orwell set out for Spain on about 23 December 1936, dining with Henry Miller in Paris on the way. Miller told Orwell that going to fight in the Civil War out of some sense of obligation or guilt was "sheer stupidity" and that the Englishman's ideas "about combating Fascism, defending democracy, etc., etc., were all baloney". A few days later in Barcelona, Orwell met John McNair of the Independent Labour Party (ILP) Office who quoted him: "I've come to fight against Fascism", but if someone had asked him what he was fighting for, "I should have answered: 'Common decency'". Orwell stepped into a complex political situation in Catalonia. The Republican government was supported by a number of factions with conflicting aims, including the Workers' Party of Marxist Unification (POUM – Partido Obrero de Unificación Marxista), the anarcho-syndicalist Confederación Nacional del Trabajo (CNT) and the Unified Socialist Party of Catalonia (a wing of the Spanish Communist Party, which was backed by Soviet arms and aid). Orwell was at first exasperated by this "kaleidoscope" of political parties and trade unions, "with their tiresome names". The ILP was linked to the POUM so Orwell joined the POUM.

After a time at the Lenin Barracks in Barcelona he was sent to the relatively quiet Aragon Front under Georges Kopp. There was very little military action and Orwell was shocked by the lack of munitions, food and firewood as well as other extreme deprivations. With his Cadet Corps and police training, Orwell was quickly made a corporal. On the arrival of a British ILP Contingent about three weeks later, Orwell and the other English militiaman, Williams, were sent with them to Monte Oscuro. The newly arrived ILP contingent included Bob Smillie, Bob Edwards, Stafford Cottman and Jack Branthwaite. The unit was then sent on to Huesca.

Meanwhile, back in England, Eileen had been handling the issues relating to the publication of The Road to Wigan Pier before setting out for Spain herself, leaving Nellie Limouzin to look after The Stores. Eileen volunteered for a post in John McNair's office and with the help of Georges Kopp paid visits to her husband, bringing him English tea, chocolate and cigars. Orwell had to spend some days in hospital with a poisoned hand and had most of his possessions stolen by the staff. He returned to the front and saw some action in a night attack on the Nationalist trenches where he chased an enemy soldier with a bayonet and bombed an enemy rifle position.

In April, Orwell returned to Barcelona. Wanting to be sent to the Madrid front, which meant he "must join the International Column", he approached a Communist friend attached to the Spanish Medical Aid and explained his case. "Although he did not think much of the Communists, Orwell was still ready to treat them as friends and allies. That would soon change." This was the time of the Barcelona May Days and Orwell was caught up in the factional fighting. He spent much of the time on a roof, with a stack of novels, but encountered Jon Kimche from his Hampstead days during the stay. The subsequent campaign of lies and distortion carried out by the Communist press, in which the POUM was accused of collaborating with the fascists, had a dramatic effect on Orwell. Instead of joining the International Brigades as he had intended, he decided to return to the Aragon Front. Once the May fighting was over, he was approached by a Communist friend who asked if he still intended transferring to the International Brigades. Orwell expressed surprise that they should still want him, because according to the Communist press he was a fascist. "No one who was in Barcelona then, or for months later, will forget the horrible atmosphere produced by fear, suspicion, hatred, censored newspapers, crammed jails, enormous food queues and prowling gangs of armed men."

After his return to the front, he was wounded in the throat by a sniper's bullet. At 6 ft 2 in (1.88 m), Orwell was considerably taller than the Spanish fighters and had been warned against standing against the trench parapet. Unable to speak, and with blood pouring from his mouth, Orwell was carried on a stretcher to Siétamo, loaded on an ambulance and after a bumpy journey via Barbastro arrived at the hospital in Lleida. He recovered sufficiently to get up and on 27 May 1937 was sent on to Tarragona and two days later to a POUM sanatorium in the suburbs of Barcelona. The bullet had missed his main artery by the barest margin and his voice was barely audible. It had been such a clean shot that the wound immediately went through the process of cauterisation. He received electrotherapy treatment and was declared medically unfit for service.

By the middle of June, the political situation in Barcelona had deteriorated and the POUM—painted by the pro-Soviet Communists as a Trotskyist organisation—was outlawed and under attack. The Communist line was that the POUM were "objectively" Fascist, hindering the Republican cause. "A particularly nasty poster appeared, showing a head with a POUM mask being ripped off to reveal a Swastika-covered face beneath." Members, including Kopp, were arrested and others were in hiding. Orwell and his wife were under threat and had to lie low, although they broke cover to try to help Kopp.

Finally with their passports in order, they escaped from Spain by train, diverting to Banyuls-sur-Mer for a short stay before returning to England. In the first week of July 1937 Orwell arrived back at Wallington; on 13 July 1937 a deposition was presented to the Tribunal for Espionage & High Treason in Valencia, charging the Orwells with "rabid Trotskyism", and being agents of the POUM. The trial of the leaders of the POUM and of Orwell (in his absence) took place in Barcelona in October and November 1938. Observing events from French Morocco, Orwell wrote that they were "only a by-product of the Russian Trotskyist trials and from the start every kind of lie, including flagrant absurdities, has been circulated in the Communist press." Orwell's experiences in the Spanish Civil War gave rise to Homage to Catalonia (1938).

In his book, The International Brigades: Fascism, Freedom and the Spanish Civil War, Giles Tremlett writes that according to Soviet files, Orwell and his wife Eileen were spied on in Barcelona in May 1937. "The papers are documentary evidence that not only Orwell, but also his wife Eileen, were being watched closely".

Rest and recuperation

Orwell returned to England in June 1937, and stayed at the O'Shaughnessy home at Greenwich. He found his views on the Spanish Civil War out of favour. Kingsley Martin rejected two of his works and Gollancz was equally cautious. At the same time, the communist Daily Worker was running an attack on The Road to Wigan Pier, taking out of context Orwell writing that "the working classes smell"; a letter to Gollancz from Orwell threatening libel action brought a stop to this. Orwell was also able to find a more sympathetic publisher for his views in Fredric Warburg of Secker & Warburg. Orwell returned to Wallington, which he found in disarray after his absence. He acquired goats, a cockerel (rooster) he called Henry Ford and a poodle puppy he called Marx; and settled down to animal husbandry and writing Homage to Catalonia.

There were thoughts of going to India to work on The Pioneer, a newspaper in Lucknow, but by March 1938 Orwell's health had deteriorated. He was admitted to Preston Hall Sanatorium at Aylesford, Kent, a British Legion hospital for ex-servicemen to which his brother-in-law Laurence O'Shaughnessy was attached. He was thought initially to be suffering from tuberculosis and stayed in the sanatorium until September. A stream of visitors came to see him, including Common, Heppenstall, Plowman and Cyril Connolly. Connolly brought with him Stephen Spender, a cause of some embarrassment as Orwell had referred to Spender as a "pansy friend" some time earlier. Homage to Catalonia was published by Secker & Warburg and was a commercial flop. In the latter part of his stay at the clinic, Orwell was able to go for walks in the countryside and study nature.

The novelist L. H. Myers secretly funded a trip to French Morocco for half a year for Orwell to avoid the English winter and recover his health. The Orwells set out in September 1938 via Gibraltar and Tangier to avoid Spanish Morocco and arrived at Marrakech. They rented a villa on the road to Casablanca and during that time Orwell wrote Coming Up for Air. They arrived back in England on 30 March 1939 and Coming Up for Air was published in June. Orwell spent time in Wallington and Southwold working on a Dickens essay and it was in June 1939 that Orwell's father, Richard Blair, died.

Second World War and Animal Farm

At the outbreak of the Second World War, Orwell's wife Eileen started working in the Censorship Department of the Ministry of Information in central London, staying during the week with her family in Greenwich. Orwell also submitted his name to the Central Register for war work, but nothing transpired. "They won't have me in the army, at any rate at present, because of my lungs", Orwell told Geoffrey Gorer. He returned to Wallington, and in late 1939 he wrote material for his first collection of essays, Inside the Whale. For the next year he was occupied writing reviews for plays, films and books for The Listener, Time and Tide and New Adelphi. On 29 March 1940 his long association with Tribune began with a review of a sergeant's account of Napoleon's retreat from Moscow. At the beginning of 1940, the first edition of Connolly's Horizon appeared, and this provided a new outlet for Orwell's work as well as new literary contacts. In May the Orwells took lease of a flat in London at Dorset Chambers, Chagford Street, Marylebone. It was the time of the Dunkirk evacuation, and the death in Flanders, France of Eileen's brother, Dr. Laurence O'Shaughnessy, caused her considerable grief and long-term depression.   Throughout this period Orwell kept a wartime diary.

Orwell was declared "unfit for any kind of military service" by the Medical Board in June, but soon afterwards found an opportunity to become involved in war activities by joining the Home Guard. He shared Tom Wintringham's socialist vision for the Home Guard as a revolutionary People's Militia. His lecture notes for instructing platoon members include advice on street fighting, field fortifications, and the use of mortars of various kinds. Sergeant Orwell managed to recruit Fredric Warburg to his unit. During the Battle of Britain he used to spend weekends with Warburg and his new Zionist friend, Tosco Fyvel, at Warburg's house at Twyford, Berkshire. At Wallington he worked on "England Your England" and in London wrote reviews for various periodicals. Visiting Eileen's family in Greenwich brought him face-to-face with the effects of the Blitz on East London. In mid-1940, Warburg, Fyvel and Orwell planned Searchlight Books. Eleven volumes eventually appeared, of which Orwell's The Lion and the Unicorn: Socialism and the English Genius, published on 19 February 1941, was the first.

Early in 1941 he began to write for the American Partisan Review which linked Orwell with The New York Intellectuals who were also anti-Stalinist, and contributed to the Gollancz anthology The Betrayal of the Left, written in the light of the Molotov–Ribbentrop Pact (although Orwell referred to it as the Russo-German Pact and the Hitler-Stalin Pact). He also applied unsuccessfully for a job at the Air Ministry. Meanwhile, he was still writing reviews of books and plays and at this time met the novelist Anthony Powell. He also took part in a few radio broadcasts for the Eastern Service of the BBC. In March the Orwells moved to a seventh-floor flat at Langford Court, St John's Wood, while at Wallington Orwell was "digging for victory" by planting potatoes.

In August 1941, Orwell finally obtained "war work" when he was taken on full-time by the BBC's Eastern Service. When interviewed for the job he indicated that he "accept[ed] absolutely the need for propaganda to be directed by the government" and stressed his view that, in wartime, discipline in the execution of government policy was essential. He supervised cultural broadcasts to India to counter propaganda from Nazi Germany designed to undermine imperial links. This was Orwell's first experience of the rigid conformity of life in an office, and it gave him an opportunity to create cultural programmes with contributions from T. S. Eliot, Dylan Thomas, E. M. Forster, Ahmed Ali, Mulk Raj Anand, and William Empson among others.

At the end of August he had a dinner with H. G. Wells which degenerated into a row because Wells had taken offence at observations Orwell made about him in a Horizon article. In October Orwell had a bout of bronchitis and the illness recurred frequently. David Astor was looking for a provocative contributor for The Observer and invited Orwell to write for him—the first article appearing in March 1942. In early 1942 Eileen changed jobs to work at the Ministry of Food and in mid-1942 the Orwells moved to a larger flat, a ground floor and basement, 10a Mortimer Crescent in Maida Vale/Kilburn—"the kind of lower-middle-class ambience that Orwell thought was London at its best." Around the same time Orwell's mother and sister Avril, who had found work in a sheet-metal factory behind King's Cross Station, moved into a flat close to George and Eileen.

At the BBC, Orwell introduced Voice, a literary programme for his Indian broadcasts, and by now was leading an active social life with literary friends, particularly on the political left. Late in 1942, he started writing regularly for the left-wing weekly Tribune directed by Labour MPs Aneurin Bevan and George Strauss. In March 1943, Orwell's mother died, and around the same time he told Moore he was starting work on a new book, which turned out to be Animal Farm.

In September 1943, Orwell resigned from the BBC post that he had occupied for two years. His resignation followed a report confirming his fears that few Indians listened to the broadcasts, but he was also keen to concentrate on writing Animal Farm. Just six days before his last day of service, on 24 November 1943, his adaptation of the fairy tale, Hans Christian Andersen's The Emperor's New Clothes was broadcast. It was a genre in which he was greatly interested and which appeared on Animal Farms title page. At this time he also resigned from the Home Guard on medical grounds.

In November 1943, Orwell was appointed literary editor at Tribune, where his assistant was his old friend Jon Kimche. Orwell was on staff until early 1945, writing over 80 book reviews and on 3 December 1943 started his regular personal column, "As I Please", usually addressing three or four subjects in each. He was still writing reviews for other magazines, including Partisan Review, Horizon, and the New York Nation and becoming a respected pundit among left-wing circles but also a close friend of people on the right such as Powell, Astor and Malcolm Muggeridge. By April 1944 Animal Farm was ready for publication. Gollancz refused to publish it, considering it an attack on the Soviet regime which was a crucial ally in the war. A similar fate was met from other publishers (including T. S. Eliot at Faber and Faber) until Jonathan Cape agreed to take it.

In May the Orwells had the opportunity to adopt a child, thanks to the contacts of Eileen's sister-in-law Gwen O'Shaughnessy, then a doctor in Newcastle upon Tyne. In June a V-1 flying bomb struck Mortimer Crescent and the Orwells had to find somewhere else to live. Orwell had to scrabble around in the rubble for his collection of books, which he had finally managed to transfer from Wallington, carting them away in a wheelbarrow. Another blow was Cape's reversal of his plan to publish Animal Farm. The decision followed his personal visit to Peter Smollett, an official at the Ministry of Information. Smollett was later identified as a Soviet agent.

The Orwells spent some time in the North East, near Carlton, County Durham, dealing with matters in the adoption of a boy whom they named Richard Horatio Blair. By September 1944 they had set up home in Islington, at 27b Canonbury Square. Baby Richard joined them there, and Eileen gave up her work at the Ministry of Food to look after her family. Secker & Warburg had agreed to publish Animal Farm, planned for the following March, although it did not appear in print until August 1945. By February 1945 David Astor had invited Orwell to become a war correspondent for The Observer. Orwell had been looking for the opportunity throughout the war, but his failed medical reports prevented him from being allowed anywhere near action. He went first to liberated Paris and then to Germany and Austria, to such cities  as Cologne and Stuttgart. He was never in the front line and was never under fire, but he followed the troops closely, "sometimes entering a captured town within a day of its fall while dead bodies lay in the streets." Some of his reports were published in the Manchester Evening News.

It was while he was there that Eileen went into hospital for a hysterectomy and died under anaesthetic on 29 March 1945. She had not given Orwell much notice about this operation because of worries about the cost and because she expected to make a speedy recovery. Orwell returned home for a while and then went back to Europe. He returned finally to London to cover the 1945 general election at the beginning of July. Animal Farm: A Fairy Story was published in Britain on 17 August 1945, and a year later in the US, on 26 August 1946.

Jura and Nineteen Eighty-Four
Animal Farm had particular resonance in the post-war climate and its worldwide success made Orwell a sought-after figure. For the next four years, Orwell mixed journalistic work—mainly for Tribune, The Observer and the Manchester Evening News, though he also contributed to many small-circulation political and literary magazines—with writing his best-known work, Nineteen Eighty-Four, which was published in 1949. He was a leading figure in the so-called Shanghai Club (named after a restaurant in Soho) of left-leaning and émigré journalists, among them E. H. Carr, Sebastian Haffner, Isaac Deutscher, Barbara Ward and Jon Kimche.

In the year following Eileen's death he published around 130 articles and a selection of his Critical Essays, while remaining active in various political lobbying campaigns. He employed a housekeeper, Susan Watson, to look after his adopted son at the Islington flat, which visitors now described as "bleak". In September he spent a fortnight on the island of Jura in the Inner Hebrides and saw it as a place to escape from the hassle of London literary life. David Astor was instrumental in arranging a place for Orwell on Jura. Astor's family owned Scottish estates in the area and a fellow Old Etonian, Robin Fletcher, had a property on the island. In late 1945 and early 1946 Orwell made several hopeless and unwelcome marriage proposals to younger women, including Celia Kirwan (who later became Arthur Koestler's sister-in-law); Ann Popham who happened to live in the same block of flats; and Sonia Brownell, one of Connolly's coterie at the Horizon office. Orwell suffered a tubercular haemorrhage in February 1946 but disguised his illness. In 1945 or early 1946, while still living at Canonbury Square, Orwell wrote an article on "British Cookery", complete with recipes, commissioned by the British Council. Given the post-war shortages, both parties agreed not to publish it. His sister Marjorie died of kidney disease in May, and soon afterwards, on 22 May 1946, Orwell set off to live on the Isle of Jura at a house known as Barnhill.

This was an abandoned farmhouse with outbuildings near the northern end of the island, at the end of a five-mile (8 km) heavily rutted track from Ardlussa, where the owners lived. Conditions at the farmhouse were primitive but the natural history and the challenge of improving the place appealed to Orwell. His sister Avril accompanied him there and young novelist Paul Potts made up the party. In July Susan Watson arrived with Orwell's son Richard. Tensions developed and Potts departed after one of his manuscripts was used to light the fire. Orwell meanwhile set to work on Nineteen Eighty-Four. Later Susan Watson's boyfriend David Holbrook arrived. A fan of Orwell since school days, he found the reality very different, with Orwell hostile and disagreeable probably because of Holbrook's membership of the Communist Party. Watson could no longer stand being with Avril and she and her boyfriend left.

Orwell returned to London in late 1946 and picked up his literary journalism again. Now a well-known writer, he was swamped with work. Apart from a visit to Jura in the new year he stayed in London for one of the coldest British winters on record and with such a national shortage of fuel that he burnt his furniture and his child's toys. The heavy smog in the days before the Clean Air Act 1956 did little to help his health, about which he was reticent, keeping clear of medical attention. Meanwhile, he had to cope with rival claims of publishers Gollancz and Warburg for publishing rights. About this time he co-edited a collection titled British Pamphleteers with Reginald Reynolds. As a result of the success of Animal Farm, Orwell was expecting a large bill from the Inland Revenue and he contacted a firm of accountants whose senior partner was Jack Harrison. The firm advised Orwell to establish a company to own his copyright and to receive his royalties and set up a "service agreement" so that he could draw a salary. Such a company, "George Orwell Productions Ltd" (GOP Ltd) was set up on 12 September 1947, although the service agreement was not then put into effect. Jack Harrison left the details at this stage to junior colleagues.

Orwell left London for Jura on 10 April 1947. In July he ended the lease on the Wallington cottage. Back on Jura he worked on Nineteen Eighty-Four and made good progress. During that time his sister's family visited, and Orwell led a disastrous boating expedition, on 19 August, which nearly led to loss of life whilst trying to cross the notorious Gulf of Corryvreckan and gave him a soaking which was not good for his health. In December a chest specialist was summoned from Glasgow who pronounced Orwell seriously ill, and a week before Christmas 1947 he was in Hairmyres Hospital in East Kilbride, then a small village in the countryside, on the outskirts of Glasgow. Tuberculosis was diagnosed and the request for permission to import streptomycin to treat Orwell went as far as Aneurin Bevan, then Minister of Health. David Astor helped with supply and payment and Orwell began his course of streptomycin on 19 or 20 February 1948. By the end of July 1948 Orwell was able to return to Jura and by December he had finished the manuscript of Nineteen Eighty-Four. In January 1949, in a very weak condition, he set off for a sanatorium at Cranham, Gloucestershire, escorted by Richard Rees. Unluckily for Orwell, streptomycin could not be continued, as he developed toxic epidermal necrolysis, a rare side effect of streptomycin.

The sanatorium at Cranham consisted of a series of small wooden chalets or huts in a remote part of the Cotswolds near Stroud. Visitors were shocked by Orwell's appearance and concerned by the shortcomings and ineffectiveness of the treatment. Friends were worried about his finances, but by now he was comparatively well off. He was writing to many of his friends, including Jacintha Buddicom, who had "rediscovered" him, and in March 1949, was visited by Celia Kirwan. Kirwan had just started working for a Foreign Office unit, the Information Research Department (IRD), set up by the Labour government to publish anti-communist propaganda, and Orwell gave her a list of people he considered to be unsuitable as IRD authors because of their pro-communist leanings. Orwell's list, not published until 2003, consisted mainly of writers but also included actors and Labour MPs. To further promote Animal Farm, the IRD commissioned cartoon strips, drawn by Norman Pett, to be placed in newspapers across the globe. Orwell received more streptomycin treatment and improved slightly. This repeat dose of streptomycin, especially after the side effect had been noticed, has been called "ill-advised". He then received penicillin, with doctors knowing fully well it was ineffective against tuberculosis. It is presumed it was given to treat his bronchiectasis. In June 1949 Nineteen Eighty-Four was published, to critical acclaim.

Final months and death

Orwell's health continued to decline after the diagnosis of tuberculosis in December 1947. In mid-1949, he courted Sonia Brownell, and they announced their engagement in September, shortly before he was removed to University College Hospital in London. Sonia took charge of Orwell's affairs and attended him diligently in the hospital. Sonia was a beauty, and her act of marrying a sick wealthy man, when his death was almost certain, has left many to doubt her intentions.

In September 1949, Orwell invited his accountant Harrison to visit him in hospital, and Harrison claimed that Orwell then asked him to become director of GOP Ltd and to manage the company, but there was no independent witness. Orwell's wedding took place in the hospital room on 13 October 1949, with David Astor as best man. Orwell was in decline and was visited by an assortment of visitors including Muggeridge, Connolly, Lucian Freud, Stephen Spender, Evelyn Waugh, Paul Potts, Anthony Powell, and his Eton tutor Anthony Gow. Plans to go to the Swiss Alps were mooted. Further meetings were held with his accountant, at which Harrison and Mr and Mrs Blair were confirmed as directors of the company, and at which Harrison claimed that the "service agreement" was executed, giving copyright to the company. Orwell's health was in decline again by Christmas. On the evening of 20 January 1950, Potts visited Orwell and slipped away on finding him asleep. Jack Harrison visited later and claimed that Orwell gave him 25% of the company. Early on the morning of 21 January, an artery burst in Orwell's lungs, killing him at age 46.

Orwell had requested to be buried in accordance with the Anglican rite in the graveyard of the closest church to wherever he happened to die. The graveyards in central London had no space, and so in an effort to ensure his last wishes could be fulfilled, his widow appealed to his friends to see whether any of them knew of a church with space in its graveyard. David Astor lived in Sutton Courtenay, Oxfordshire, and arranged for Orwell to be interred in the churchyard of All Saints' there. Orwell's gravestone bears the epitaph: "Here lies Eric Arthur Blair, born June 25th 1903, died January 21st 1950"; no mention is made on the gravestone of his more famous pen name. 

The funeral was organized by Anthony Powell and Malcom Muggeridge. Powell chose the hymns: "All people that on earth do dwell," "Guide me, O thou great Redeemer" and "Ten thousand times ten thousand". 

Orwell's adopted son, Richard Horatio Blair, was brought up by Orwell's sister, Avril Dunn (née Blair), his legal guardian, and her husband, Bill Dunn.

In 1979, Sonia Brownell brought a High Court action against Harrison when he declared an intention to subdivide his 25 percent share of the company between his three children. For Sonia, the consequence of this manoeuvre would have made getting overall control of the company three times more difficult. She was considered to have a strong case, but was becoming increasingly ill and eventually was persuaded to settle out of court on 2 November 1980. She died on 11 December 1980, aged 62.

Literary career and legacy
During most of his career, Orwell was best known for his journalism, in essays, reviews, columns in newspapers and magazines and in his books of reportage: Down and Out in Paris and London (describing a period of poverty in these cities), The Road to Wigan Pier (describing the living conditions of the poor in northern England, and class division generally) and Homage to Catalonia. According to Irving Howe, Orwell was "the best English essayist since Hazlitt, perhaps since Dr Johnson".

Modern readers are more often introduced to Orwell as a novelist, particularly through his enormously successful titles Animal Farm and Nineteen Eighty-Four. The former is often thought to reflect degeneration in the Soviet Union after the Russian Revolution and the rise of Stalinism; the latter, life under totalitarian rule. Nineteen Eighty-Four is often compared to Brave New World by Aldous Huxley; both are powerful dystopian novels warning of a future world where the state machine exerts complete control over social life. In 1984, Nineteen Eighty-Four and Ray Bradbury's Fahrenheit 451 were honoured with the Prometheus Award for their contributions to dystopian literature. In 2011 he received it again for Animal Farm. In 2003, Nineteen Eighty-Four was listed at number 8 and Animal Farm at number 46 on the BBC's The Big Read poll. In 2021, readers of the New York Times Book Review rated Nineteen Eighty-Four third in a list of "The best books of the past 125 years."

Coming Up for Air, his last novel before World War II, is the most "English" of his novels; alarms of war mingle with images of idyllic Thames-side Edwardian childhood of protagonist George Bowling. The novel is pessimistic; industrialism and capitalism have killed the best of Old England, and there were great, new external threats. In homely terms, its protagonist George Bowling posits the totalitarian hypotheses of Franz Borkenau, Orwell, Ignazio Silone and Koestler: "Old Hitler's something different. So's Joe Stalin. They aren't like these chaps in the old days who crucified people and chopped their heads off and so forth, just for the fun of it ... They're something quite new—something that's never been heard of before".

Literary influences
In an autobiographical piece that Orwell sent to the editors of Twentieth Century Authors in 1940, he wrote: "The writers I care about most and never grow tired of are: Shakespeare, Swift, Fielding, Dickens, Charles Reade, Flaubert and, among modern writers, James Joyce, T. S. Eliot and D. H. Lawrence. But I believe the modern writer who has influenced me most is W. Somerset Maugham, whom I admire immensely for his power of telling a story straightforwardly and without frills." Elsewhere, Orwell strongly praised the works of Jack London, especially his book The Road. Orwell's investigation of poverty in The Road to Wigan Pier strongly resembles that of Jack London's The People of the Abyss, in which the American journalist disguises himself as an out-of-work sailor to investigate the lives of the poor in London. In his essay "Politics vs. Literature: An Examination of Gulliver's Travels" (1946) Orwell wrote: "If I had to make a list of six books which were to be preserved when all others were destroyed, I would certainly put Gulliver's Travels among them." On H. G. Wells he wrote, "The minds of all of us, and therefore the physical world, would be perceptibly different if Wells had never existed."

Orwell was an admirer of Arthur Koestler and became a close friend during the three years that Koestler and his wife Mamain spent at the cottage of Bwlch Ocyn, a secluded farmhouse that belonged to Clough Williams-Ellis, in the Vale of Ffestiniog. Orwell reviewed Koestler's Darkness at Noon for the New Statesman in 1941, saying:
Brilliant as this book is as a novel, and a piece of brilliant literature, it is probably most valuable as an interpretation of the Moscow "confessions" by someone with an inner knowledge of totalitarian methods. What was frightening about these trials was not the fact that they happened—for obviously such things are necessary in a totalitarian society—but the eagerness of Western intellectuals to justify them.

Other writers Orwell admired included: Ralph Waldo Emerson, George Gissing, Graham Greene, Herman Melville, Henry Miller, Tobias Smollett, Mark Twain, Joseph Conrad, and Yevgeny Zamyatin. He was both an admirer and a critic of Rudyard Kipling, praising Kipling as a gifted writer and a "good bad poet" whose work is "spurious" and "morally insensitive and aesthetically disgusting," but undeniably seductive and able to speak to certain aspects of reality more effectively than more enlightened authors. He had a similarly ambivalent attitude to G. K. Chesterton, whom he regarded as a writer of considerable talent who had chosen to devote himself to "Roman Catholic propaganda", and to Evelyn Waugh, who was, he wrote, "ab[ou]t as good a novelist as one can be (i.e. as novelists go today) while holding untenable opinions".

Orwell as literary critic
Throughout his life Orwell continually supported himself as a book reviewer. His reviews are well known and have had an influence on literary criticism. He wrote in the conclusion to his 1940 essay on Charles Dickens,

George Woodcock suggested that the last two sentences also describe Orwell.

Orwell wrote a critique of George Bernard Shaw's play Arms and the Man. He considered this Shaw's best play and the most likely to remain socially relevant, because of its theme that war is not, generally speaking, a glorious romantic adventure. His 1945 essay In Defence of P.G. Wodehouse contains an amusing assessment of Wodehouse's writing and also argues that his broadcasts from Germany (during the war) did not really make him a traitor. He accused The Ministry of Information of exaggerating Wodehouse's actions for propaganda purposes.

Food writing 
In 1946, the British Council commissioned Orwell to write an essay on British food as part of a drive to promote British relations abroad. In the essay titled British Cookery, Orwell described the British diet as "a simple, rather heavy, perhaps slightly barbarous diet" and where "hot drinks are acceptable at most hours of the day". He discusses the ritual of breakfast in the UK, "this is not a snack but a serious meal. The hour at which people have their breakfast is of course governed by the time at which they go to work." He wrote that high tea in the United Kingdom consisted of a variety of savoury and sweet dishes, but "no tea would be considered a good one if it did not include at least one kind of cake”, before adding ”as well as cakes, biscuits are much eaten at tea-time”. Orwell included a recipe for marmalade, a popular British spread on bread. However, the British Council declined to publish the essay on the grounds that it was too problematic to write about food at the time of strict rationing in the UK. In 2019, the essay was discovered in the British Council's archives along with the rejection letter. The British Council issued an official apology to Orwell over the rejection of the commissioned essay.

Reception and evaluations of Orwell's works

Arthur Koestler said that Orwell's "uncompromising intellectual honesty made him appear almost inhuman at times". Ben Wattenberg stated: "Orwell's writing pierced intellectual hypocrisy wherever he found it". According to historian Piers Brendon, "Orwell was the saint of common decency who would in earlier days, said his BBC boss Rushbrook Williams, 'have been either canonised—or burnt at the stake'". Raymond Williams in Politics and Letters: Interviews with New Left Review describes Orwell as a "successful impersonation of a plain man who bumps into experience in an unmediated way and tells the truth about it". Christopher Norris declared that Orwell's "homespun empiricist outlook—his assumption that the truth was just there to be told in a straightforward common-sense way—now seems not merely naïve but culpably self-deluding". The American scholar Scott Lucas has described Orwell as an enemy of the Left. John Newsinger has argued that Lucas could only do this by portraying "all of Orwell's attacks on Stalinism [–] as if they were attacks on socialism, despite Orwell's continued insistence that they were not".

Orwell's work has taken a prominent place in the school literature curriculum in England, with Animal Farm a regular examination topic at the end of secondary education (GCSE), and Nineteen Eighty-Four a topic for subsequent examinations below university level (A Levels). A 2016 UK poll saw Animal Farm ranked the nation's favourite book from school.

Historian John Rodden stated: "John Podhoretz did claim that if Orwell were alive today, he'd be standing with the neo-conservatives and against the Left. And the question arises, to what extent can you even begin to predict the political positions of somebody who's been dead three decades and more by that time?"

In Orwell's Victory, Christopher Hitchens argues: "In answer to the accusation of inconsistency Orwell as a writer was forever taking his own temperature. In other words, here was someone who never stopped testing and adjusting his intelligence".

John Rodden points out the "undeniable conservative features in the Orwell physiognomy" and remarks on how "to some extent Orwell facilitated the kinds of uses and abuses by the Right that his name has been put to. In other ways there has been the politics of selective quotation." Rodden refers to the essay "Why I Write", in which Orwell refers to the Spanish Civil War as being his "watershed political experience", saying: "The Spanish War and other events in 1936–37, turned the scale. Thereafter I knew where I stood. Every line of serious work that I have written since 1936 has been written directly or indirectly against totalitarianism and for democratic socialism as I understand it." (emphasis in original) Rodden goes on to explain how, during the McCarthy era, the introduction to the Signet edition of Animal Farm, which sold more than 20 million copies, makes use of selective quotation:
"[Introduction]: If the book itself, Animal Farm, had left any doubt of the matter, Orwell dispelled it in his essay Why I Write: 'Every line of serious work that I've written since 1936 has been written directly or indirectly against Totalitarianism ....'[Rodden]: dot, dot, dot, dot, the politics of ellipsis. 'For Democratic Socialism' is vaporized, just like Winston Smith did it at the Ministry of Truth, and that's very much what happened at the beginning of the McCarthy era and just continued, Orwell being selectively quoted."

Fyvel wrote about Orwell: "His crucial experience [...] was his struggle to turn himself into a writer, one which led through long periods of poverty, failure and humiliation, and about which he has written almost nothing directly. The sweat and agony was less in the slum-life than in the effort to turn the experience into literature."

Influence on language and writing
In his essay "Politics and the English Language" (1946), Orwell wrote about the importance of precise and clear language, arguing that vague writing can be used as a powerful tool of political manipulation because it shapes the way we think. In that essay, Orwell provides six rules for writers:
 Never use a metaphor, simile or other figure of speech which you are used to seeing in print.
 Never use a long word where a short one will do.
 If it is possible to cut a word out, always cut it out.
 Never use the passive where you can use the active.
 Never use a foreign phrase, a scientific word or a jargon word if you can think of an everyday English equivalent.
 Break any of these rules sooner than say anything outright barbarous.

Orwell worked as a journalist at The Observer for seven years, and its editor David Astor gave a copy of this celebrated essay to every new recruit. In 2003, literary editor at the newspaper  Robert McCrum wrote, "Even now, it is quoted in our style book". Journalist Jonathan Heawood noted: "Orwell's criticism of slovenly language is still taken very seriously."

Andrew N. Rubin argues that "Orwell claimed that we should be attentive to how the use of language has limited our capacity for critical thought just as we should be equally concerned with the ways in which dominant modes of thinking have reshaped the very language that we use."

The adjective "Orwellian" connotes an attitude and a policy of control by propaganda, surveillance, misinformation, denial of truth and manipulation of the past. In Nineteen Eighty-Four, Orwell described a totalitarian government that controlled thought by controlling language, making certain ideas literally unthinkable. Several words and phrases from Nineteen Eighty-Four have entered popular language. "Newspeak" is a simplified and obfuscatory language designed to make independent thought impossible. "Doublethink" means holding two contradictory beliefs simultaneously. The "Thought Police" are those who suppress all dissenting opinion. "Prolefeed" is homogenised, manufactured superficial literature, film and music used to control and indoctrinate the populace through docility. "Big Brother" is a supreme dictator who watches everyone. Other neologisms from the novel include,  "Two Minutes Hate", "Room 101", "memory hole", "unperson", and "thoughtcrime", as well as providing direct inspiration for the neologism "groupthink".

Orwell may have been the first to use the term "cold war" to refer to the state of tension between powers in the Western Bloc and the Eastern Bloc that followed World War II in his essay, "You and the Atom Bomb", published in Tribune on 19 October 1945. He wrote:
"We may be heading not for general breakdown but for an epoch as horribly stable as the slave empires of antiquity. James Burnham's theory has been much discussed, but few people have yet considered its ideological implications—this is, the kind of world-view, the kind of beliefs, and the social structure that would probably prevail in a State which was at once unconquerable and in a permanent state of 'cold war' with its neighbours."

Modern culture
Apart from theatre adaptations of his books, several stage plays were written with Orwell as one of the main characters.

 In 2014, a play written by playwright Joe Sutton titled Orwell in America was first performed by the Northern Stage theatre company in White River Junction, Vermont. It is a fictitious account of Orwell doing a book tour in the United States (something he never did in his lifetime). It moved to off-Broadway in 2016. 
 In 2017, the play Mrs Orwell by British playwright Tony Cox opened at the Old Red Lion Theatre in London before transferring to the Southwark Playhouse. It centres on Orwell's second wife Sonia Brownell (played by Cressida Bonas), her reasons for marrying Orwell and her relationship with Lucian Freud.
 In 2019, Tasmanian theatre company Blue Cow presented the play 101 by Cameron Hindrum, in which Orwell is seen working on his novel 1984 "while keeping his severe illness at bay and balancing the demands of fatherhood, art, family and success."

Orwell's birthplace, a bungalow in Motihari, Bihar, India, was opened as a museum in May 2015, several years after local residents petitioned for conservation of the building. In January 2021, Orwell's bust near the museum was vandalised. Reviews for the George Orwell Birthplace Museum posted on Google since then suggest the museum is not in good shape.

The Orwell Society was founded in 2011 to promote understanding of the life and work of George Orwell.

Statue

A statue of George Orwell, sculpted by the British sculptor Martin Jennings, was unveiled on 7 November 2017 outside Broadcasting House, the headquarters of the BBC. The wall behind the statue is inscribed with the following phrase: "If liberty means anything at all, it means the right to tell people what they do not want to hear". These are words from his proposed preface to Animal Farm and a rallying cry for the idea of free speech in an open society.

Personal life

Childhood
Jacintha Buddicom's account, Eric & Us, provides an insight into Blair's childhood. She quoted his sister Avril that "he was essentially an aloof, undemonstrative person" and said herself of his friendship with the Buddicoms: "I do not think he needed any other friends beyond the schoolfriend he occasionally and appreciatively referred to as 'CC'". She could not recall him having schoolfriends to stay and exchange visits as her brother Prosper often did in holidays. Cyril Connolly provides an account of Blair as a child in Enemies of Promise. Years later, Blair mordantly recalled his prep school in the essay "Such, Such Were the Joys", claiming among other things that he "was made to study like a dog" to earn a scholarship, which he alleged was solely to enhance the school's prestige with parents. Jacintha Buddicom repudiated Orwell's schoolboy misery described in the essay, stating that "he was a specially happy child". She noted that he did not like his name because it reminded him of a book he greatly disliked—Eric, or, Little by Little, a Victorian boys' school story.

Connolly remarked of him as a schoolboy, "The remarkable thing about Orwell was that alone among the boys he was an intellectual and not a parrot for he thought for himself". At Eton, John Vaughan Wilkes, his former headmaster's son at St Cyprians, recalled that "he was extremely argumentative—about anything—and criticising the masters and criticising the other boys [...] We enjoyed arguing with him. He would generally win the arguments—or think he had anyhow." Roger Mynors concurs: "Endless arguments about all sorts of things, in which he was one of the great leaders. He was one of those boys who thought for himself."

Blair liked to carry out practical jokes. Buddicom recalls him swinging from the luggage rack in a railway carriage like an orangutan to frighten a woman passenger out of the compartment. At Eton, he played tricks on John Crace, his housemaster, among which was to enter a spoof advertisement in a college magazine implying pederasty. Gow, his tutor, said he "made himself as big a nuisance as he could" and "was a very unattractive boy". Later Blair was expelled from the crammer at Southwold for sending a dead rat as a birthday present to the town surveyor. In one of his As I Please essays he refers to a protracted joke when he answered an advertisement for a woman who claimed a cure for obesity.

Blair had an interest in natural history which stemmed from his childhood. In letters from school he wrote about caterpillars and butterflies, and Buddicom recalls his keen interest in ornithology. He also enjoyed fishing and shooting rabbits, and conducting experiments as in cooking a hedgehog or shooting down a jackdaw from the Eton roof to dissect it. His zeal for scientific experiments extended to explosives—again Buddicom recalls a cook giving notice because of the noise. Later in Southwold, his sister Avril recalled him blowing up the garden. When teaching he enthused his students with his nature-rambles both at Southwold and at Hayes. His adult diaries are permeated with his observations on nature.

Relationships and marriage
Buddicom and Blair lost touch shortly after he went to Burma and she became unsympathetic towards him. She wrote that it was because of the letters he wrote complaining about his life, but an addendum to Eric & Us by Venables reveals that he may have lost her sympathy through an incident which was, at best, a clumsy attempt at seduction.

Mabel Fierz, who later became Blair's confidante, said: "He used to say the one thing he wished in this world was that he'd been attractive to women. He liked women and had many girlfriends I think in Burma. He had a girl in Southwold and another girl in London. He was rather a womaniser, yet he was afraid he wasn't attractive."

Brenda Salkield (Southwold) preferred friendship to any deeper relationship and maintained a correspondence with Blair for many years, particularly as a sounding board for his ideas. She wrote: "He was a great letter writer. Endless letters, and I mean when he wrote you a letter he wrote pages." His correspondence with Eleanor Jacques (London) was more prosaic, dwelling on a closer relationship and referring to past rendezvous or planning future ones in London and Burnham Beeches.

When Orwell was in the sanatorium in Kent, his wife's friend Lydia Jackson visited. He invited her for a walk and out of sight "an awkward situation arose." Jackson was to be the most critical of Orwell's marriage to Eileen O'Shaughnessy, but their later correspondence hints at a complicity. Eileen at the time was more concerned about Orwell's closeness to Brenda Salkield. Orwell had an affair with his secretary at Tribune which caused Eileen much distress, and others have been mooted. In a letter to Ann Popham he wrote: "I was sometimes unfaithful to Eileen, and I also treated her badly, and I think she treated me badly, too, at times, but it was a real marriage, in the sense that we had been through awful struggles together and she understood all about my work, etc." Similarly he suggested to Celia Kirwan that they had both been unfaithful. There are several testaments that it was a well-matched and happy marriage.

In June 1944, Orwell and Eileen adopted a three-week-old boy they named Richard Horatio. According to Richard, Orwell was a wonderful father who gave him devoted, if rather rugged, attention and a great degree of freedom. After Orwell's death Richard went to live with Orwell's sister and her husband.

Blair was very lonely after Eileen's death in 1945, and desperate for a wife, both as companion for himself and as mother for Richard. He proposed marriage to four women, including Celia Kirwan, and eventually Sonia Brownell accepted. Orwell had met her when she was assistant to Cyril Connolly, at Horizon literary magazine. They were married on 13 October 1949, only three months before Orwell's death. Some maintain that Sonia was the model for Julia in Nineteen Eighty-Four.

Social interactions
Orwell was noted for very close and enduring friendships with a few friends, but these were generally people with a similar background or with a similar level of literary ability. Ungregarious, he was out of place in a crowd and his discomfort was exacerbated when he was outside his own class. Though representing himself as a spokesman for the common man, he often appeared out of place with real working people. His brother-in-law Humphrey Dakin, a "Hail fellow, well met" type, who took him to a local pub in Leeds, said that he was told by the landlord: "Don't bring that bugger in here again." Adrian Fierz commented "He wasn't interested in racing or greyhounds or pub crawling or shove ha'penny. He just did not have much in common with people who did not share his intellectual interests." Awkwardness attended many of his encounters with working-class representatives, as with Pollitt and McNair, but his courtesy and good manners were often commented on. Jack Common observed on meeting him for the first time, "Right away manners, and more than manners—breeding—showed through."

In his tramping days, he did domestic work for a time. His extreme politeness was recalled by a member of the family he worked for; she declared that the family referred to him as "Laurel" after the film comedian. With his gangling figure and awkwardness, Orwell's friends often saw him as a figure of fun. Geoffrey Gorer commented "He was awfully likely to knock things off tables, trip over things. I mean, he was a gangling, physically badly co-ordinated young man. I think his feeling [was] that even the inanimate world was against him." When he shared a flat with Heppenstall and Sayer, he was treated in a patronising manner by the younger men. At the BBC in the 1940s, "everybody would pull his leg" and Spender described him as having real entertainment value "like, as I say, watching a Charlie Chaplin movie". A friend of Eileen's reminisced about her tolerance and humour, often at Orwell's expense.

One biography of Orwell accused him of having had an authoritarian streak. In Burma, he struck out at a Burmese boy who, while "fooling around" with his friends, had "accidentally bumped into him" at a station, resulting in Orwell falling "heavily" down some stairs. One of his former pupils recalled being beaten so hard he could not sit down for a week. When sharing a flat with Orwell, Heppenstall came home late one night in an advanced stage of loud inebriation. The upshot was that Heppenstall ended up with a bloody nose and was locked in a room. When he complained, Orwell hit him across the legs with a shooting stick and Heppenstall then had to defend himself with a chair. Years later, after Orwell's death, Heppenstall wrote a dramatic account of the incident called "The Shooting Stick" and Mabel Fierz confirmed that Heppenstall came to her in a sorry state the following day.

Orwell got on well with young people. The pupil he beat considered him the best of teachers and the young recruits in Barcelona tried to drink him under the table without success. His nephew recalled Uncle Eric laughing louder than anyone in the cinema at a Charlie Chaplin film.

In the wake of his most famous works, he attracted many uncritical hangers-on, but many others who sought him found him aloof and even dull. With his soft voice, he was sometimes shouted down or excluded from discussions. At this time, he was severely ill; it was wartime or the austerity period after it; during the war his wife suffered from depression; and after her death he was lonely and unhappy. In addition to that, he always lived frugally and seemed unable to care for himself properly. As a result of all this, people found his circumstances bleak. Some, like Michael Ayrton, called him "Gloomy George", but others developed the idea that he was an "English secular saint".

Although Orwell was frequently heard on the BBC for panel discussion and one-man broadcasts, no recorded copy of his voice is known to exist.

Lifestyle
Orwell was a heavy smoker, who rolled his own cigarettes from strong shag tobacco, despite his bronchial condition. His penchant for the rugged life often took him to cold and damp situations, both in the long term, as in Catalonia and Jura, and short term, for example, motorcycling in the rain and suffering a shipwreck. Described by The Economist as "perhaps the 20th century's best chronicler of English culture", Orwell considered fish and chips, football, the pub, strong tea, cut-price chocolate, the movies, and radio among the chief comforts for the working class. He advocated a patriotic defence of a British way of life that could not be trusted to intellectuals or, by implication, the state:

Orwell enjoyed strong tea—he had Fortnum & Mason's tea brought to him in Catalonia. His 1946 essay, "A Nice Cup of Tea", appeared in the London Evening Standard article on how to make tea, with Orwell writing, "tea is one of the mainstays of civilisation in this country and causes violent disputes over how it should be made", with the main issue being whether to put tea in the cup first and add the milk afterward, or the other way round, on which he states, "in every family in Britain there are probably two schools of thought on the subject". He appreciated English beer, taken regularly and moderately, despised drinkers of lager, and wrote about an imagined, ideal British pub in his 1946 Evening Standard article, "The Moon Under Water". Not as particular about food, he enjoyed the wartime "Victory Pie" and extolled canteen food at the BBC. He preferred traditional English dishes, such as roast beef, and kippers. His 1945 essay, "In Defence of English Cooking", included Yorkshire pudding, crumpets, muffins, innumerable biscuits, Christmas pudding, shortbread, various British cheeses and Oxford marmalade. Reports of his Islington days refer to the cosy afternoon tea table.

His dress sense was unpredictable and usually casual. In Southwold, he had the best cloth from the local tailor, but was equally happy in his tramping outfit. His attire in the Spanish Civil War, along with his size-12 boots, was a source of amusement. David Astor described him as looking like a prep school master, while according to the Special Branch dossier, Orwell's tendency to dress "in Bohemian fashion" revealed that the author was "a Communist".

Orwell's confusing approach to matters of social decorum—on the one hand expecting a working-class guest to dress for dinner, and on the other, slurping tea out of a saucer at the BBC canteen—helped stoke his reputation as an English eccentric.

Views

Religion

Orwell was an atheist who identified himself with the humanist outlook on life. Despite this, and despite his criticisms of both religious doctrine and religious organisations, he nevertheless regularly participated in the social and civic life of the church, including by attending Church of England Holy Communion. Acknowledging this contradiction, he once said: "It seems rather mean to go to HC [Holy Communion] when one doesn't believe, but I have passed myself off for pious & there is nothing for it but to keep up with the deception." He had two Anglican marriages and left instructions for an Anglican funeral. Orwell was also extremely well-read in Biblical literature and could quote lengthy passages from the Book of Common Prayer from memory. His extensive knowledge of the Bible came coupled with unsparing criticism of its philosophy, and as an adult he could not bring himself to believe in its tenets. He said in part V of his essay, "Such, Such Were the Joys", that "Till about the age of fourteen I believed in God, and believed that the accounts given of him were true. But I was well aware that I did not love him." Orwell directly contrasted Christianity with secular humanism in his essay "Lear, Tolstoy and the Fool", finding the latter philosophy more palatable and less "self-interested". Literary critic James Wood wrote that in the struggle, as he saw it, between Christianity and humanism, "Orwell was on the humanist side, of course—basically an unmetaphysical, English version of Camus's philosophy of perpetual godless struggle."

Orwell's writing was often explicitly critical of religion, and Christianity in particular. He found the church to be a "selfish [...] church of the landed gentry" with its establishment "out of touch" with the majority of its communicants and altogether a pernicious influence on public life. In their 1972 study, The Unknown Orwell, the writers Peter Stansky and William Abrahams noted that at Eton Blair displayed a "sceptical attitude" to Christian belief. Crick observed that Orwell displayed "a pronounced anti-Catholicism". Evelyn Waugh, writing in 1946, acknowledged Orwell's high moral sense and respect for justice but believed "he seems never to have been touched at any point by a conception of religious thought and life." His contradictory and sometimes ambiguous views about the social benefits of religious affiliation mirrored the dichotomies between his public and private lives: Stephen Ingle wrote that it was as if the writer George Orwell "vaunted" his unbelief while Eric Blair the individual retained "a deeply ingrained religiosity".

Politics
Orwell liked to provoke arguments by challenging the status quo, but he was also a traditionalist with a love of old English values. He criticised and satirised, from the inside, the various social milieux in which he found himself—provincial town life in A Clergyman's Daughter; middle-class pretension in Keep the Aspidistra Flying; preparatory schools in "Such, Such Were the Joys"; and some socialist groups in The Road to Wigan Pier. In his Adelphi days, he described himself as a "Tory-anarchist". Of colonialism in Burmese Days, he portrays the English colonists as a "dull, decent people, cherishing and fortifying their dullness behind a quarter of a million bayonets."

In 1928, Orwell began his career as a professional writer in Paris at a journal owned by the French Communist Henri Barbusse. His first article, "La Censure en Angleterre" ("Censorship in England"), was an attempt to account for the "extraordinary and illogical" moral censorship of plays and novels then practised in Britain. His own explanation was that the rise of the "puritan middle class", who had stricter morals than the aristocracy, tightened the rules of censorship in the 19th century. Orwell's first published article in his home country, "A Farthing Newspaper", was a critique of the new French daily the Ami du Peuple. This paper was sold much more cheaply than most others, and was intended for ordinary people to read. Orwell pointed out that its proprietor François Coty also owned the right-wing dailies Le Figaro and Le Gaulois, which the Ami du Peuple was supposedly competing against. Orwell suggested that cheap newspapers were no more than a vehicle for advertising and anti-leftist propaganda, and predicted the world might soon see free newspapers which would drive legitimate dailies out of business.

Writing for Le Progrès Civique, Orwell described the British colonial government in Burma and India:

Spanish Civil War and socialism

The Spanish Civil War played the most important part in defining Orwell's socialism. He wrote to Cyril Connolly from Barcelona on 8 June 1937: "I have seen wonderful things and at last really believe in Socialism, which I never did before." Having witnessed anarcho-syndicalist communities, for example in Anarchist Catalonia, and the subsequent brutal suppression of the anarcho-syndicalists, anti-Stalin communist parties and revolutionaries by the Soviet Union-backed Communists, Orwell returned from Catalonia a staunch anti-Stalinist and joined the British Independent Labour Party, his card being issued on 13 June 1938. Although he was never a Trotskyist, he was strongly influenced by the Trotskyist and anarchist critiques of the Soviet regime, and by the anarchists' emphasis on individual freedom. In Part 2 of The Road to Wigan Pier, published by the Left Book Club, Orwell stated that "a real Socialist is one who wishes—not merely conceives it as desirable, but actively wishes—to see tyranny overthrown". Orwell stated in "Why I Write" (1946): "Every line of serious work that I have written since 1936 has been written, directly or indirectly, against totalitarianism and for democratic socialism, as I understand it." Orwell's conception of socialism was of a planned economy alongside democracy, which was the common notion of socialism in the early and middle 20th century. Orwell's emphasis on "democracy" primarily referred to a strong emphasis on civil liberties within a socialist economy as opposed to majoritarian rule, though he was not necessarily opposed to majority rule. Orwell was a proponent of a federal socialist Europe, a position outlined in his 1947 essay "Toward European Unity", which first appeared in Partisan Review. According to biographer John Newsinger:

In his 1938 essay "Why I joined the Independent Labour Party," published in the ILP-affiliated New Leader, Orwell wrote:

Towards the end of the essay, he wrote: "I do not mean I have lost all faith in the Labour Party. My most earnest hope is that the Labour Party will win a clear majority in the next General Election."

The Second World War
Orwell was opposed to rearmament against Nazi Germany and at the time of the Munich Agreement he signed a manifesto entitled "If War Comes We Shall Resist"—but he changed his view after the Molotov–Ribbentrop Pact and the outbreak of the war. He left the ILP because of its opposition to the war and adopted a political position of "revolutionary patriotism". On 21 March 1940 he wrote a review of Adolf Hitler's Mein Kampf for The New English Weekly, in which he analysed the dictator's psychology. According to Orwell "a thing that strikes one is the rigidity of his mind, the way in which his world-view doesn't develop. It is the fixed vision of a monomaniac and not likely to be much affected by the temporary manoeuvres of power politics". Asking "how was it that he was able to put [his] monstrous vision across?", Orwell tried to understand why Hitler was worshipped by the German people: "The situation in Germany, with its seven million unemployed, was obviously favourable for demagogues. But Hitler could not have succeeded against his many rivals if it had not been for the attraction of his own personality, which one can feel even in the clumsy writing of Mein Kampf, and which is no doubt overwhelming when one hears his speeches...The fact is that there is something deeply appealing about him. The initial, personal cause of his grievance against the universe can only be guessed at; but at any rate the grievance is here. He is the martyr, the victim, Prometheus chained to the rock, the self-sacrificing hero who fights single-handed against impossible odds. If he were killing a mouse he would know how to make it seem like a dragon." In December 1940 he wrote in Tribune (the Labour left's weekly): "We are in a strange period of history in which a revolutionary has to be a patriot and a patriot has to be a revolutionary." During the war, Orwell was highly critical of the popular idea that an Anglo-Soviet alliance would be the basis of a post-war world of peace and prosperity. In 1942, commenting on London Times editor E. H. Carr's pro-Soviet views, Orwell stated that "all the appeasers, e.g. Professor E.H. Carr, have switched their allegiance from Hitler to Stalin".

In his reply (dated 15 November 1943) to an invitation from the Duchess of Atholl to speak for the British League for European Freedom, he stated that he did not agree with their objectives. He admitted that what they said was "more truthful than the lying propaganda found in most of the press", but added that he could not "associate himself with an essentially Conservative body" that claimed to "defend democracy in Europe" but had "nothing to say about British imperialism". His closing paragraph stated: "I belong to the Left and must work inside it, much as I hate Russian totalitarianism and its poisonous influence in this country."

Tribune and post-war Britain

Orwell joined the staff of Tribune magazine as literary editor, and from then until his death, was a left-wing (though hardly orthodox) Labour-supporting democratic socialist.

On 1 September 1944, writing about the Warsaw uprising, Orwell expressed in Tribune his hostility against the influence of the alliance with the USSR over the allies: "Do remember that dishonesty and cowardice always have to be paid for. Do not imagine that for years on end you can make yourself the boot-licking propagandist of the sovietic regime, or any other regime, and then suddenly return to honesty and reason. Once a whore, always a whore." According to Newsinger, although Orwell "was always critical of the 1945–51 Labour government's moderation, his support for it began to pull him to the right politically. This did not lead him to embrace conservatism, imperialism or reaction, but to defend, albeit critically, Labour reformism." Between 1945 and 1947, with A. J. Ayer and Bertrand Russell, he contributed a series of articles and essays to Polemic, a short-lived British "Magazine of Philosophy, Psychology, and Aesthetics" edited by the ex-Communist Humphrey Slater.

Writing in early 1945 a long essay titled "Antisemitism in Britain", for the Contemporary Jewish Record, Orwell stated that antisemitism was on the increase in Britain and that it was "irrational and will not yield to arguments". He argued that it would be useful to discover why anti-Semites could "swallow such absurdities on one particular subject while remaining sane on others". He wrote: "For quite six years the English admirers of Hitler contrived not to learn of the existence of Dachau and Buchenwald. ... Many English people have heard almost nothing about the extermination of German and Polish Jews during the present war. Their own anti-Semitism has caused this vast crime to bounce off their consciousness." In Nineteen Eighty-Four, written shortly after the war, Orwell portrayed the Party as enlisting anti-Semitic passions against their enemy, Goldstein.

Orwell publicly defended P. G. Wodehouse against charges of being a Nazi sympathiser—occasioned by his agreement to do some broadcasts over the German radio in 1941—a defence based on Wodehouse's lack of interest in and ignorance of politics.

Special Branch, the intelligence division of the Metropolitan Police, maintained a file on Orwell for more than 20 years of his life. The dossier, published by The National Archives, states that, according to one investigator, Orwell had "advanced Communist views and several of his Indian friends say that they have often seen him at Communist meetings". MI5, the intelligence department of the Home Office, noted: "It is evident from his recent writings—'The Lion and the Unicorn'—and his contribution to Gollancz's symposium The Betrayal of the Left that he does not hold with the Communist Party nor they with him."

Sexuality
Sexual politics plays an important role in Nineteen Eighty-Four. In the novel, people's intimate relationships are strictly governed by the party's Junior Anti-Sex League, by opposing sexual relations and instead encouraging artificial insemination. Personally, Orwell disliked what he thought as misguided middle-class revolutionary emancipatory views, expressing disdain for "every fruit-juice drinker, nudist, sandal-wearer, sex-maniacs".

Orwell was also openly against homosexuality, at a time when such prejudice was common. Speaking at the 2003 George Orwell Centenary Conference, Daphne Patai said: "Of course he was homophobic. That has nothing to do with his relations with his homosexual friends. Certainly, he had a negative attitude and a certain kind of anxiety, a denigrating attitude towards homosexuality. That is definitely the case. I think his writing reflects that quite fully."

Orwell used the homophobic epithets "nancy" and "pansy", for example, in expressions of contempt for what he called the "pansy Left", and "nancy poets", i.e. left-wing homosexual or bisexual writers and intellectuals such as Stephen Spender and W. H. Auden. The protagonist of Keep the Aspidistra Flying, Gordon Comstock, conducts an internal critique of his customers when working in a bookshop, and there is an extended passage of several pages in which he concentrates on a homosexual male customer, and sneers at him for his "nancy" characteristics, including a lisp, which he identifies in detail, with some disgust. Stephen Spender "thought Orwell's occasional homophobic outbursts were part of his rebellion against the public school".

Biographies of Orwell
Orwell's will requested that no biography of him be written, and his widow, Sonia Brownell, repelled every attempt by those who tried to persuade her to let them write about him. Various recollections and interpretations were published in the 1950s and 1960s, but Sonia saw the 1968 Collected Works as the record of his life. She did appoint Malcolm Muggeridge as official biographer, but later biographers have seen this as deliberate spoiling as Muggeridge eventually gave up the work. In 1972, two American authors, Peter Stansky and William Abrahams, produced The Unknown Orwell, an unauthorised account of his early years that lacked any support or contribution from Sonia Brownell.

Sonia Brownell then commissioned Bernard Crick, a professor of politics at the University of London, to complete a biography and asked Orwell's friends to co-operate. Crick collated a considerable amount of material in his work, which was published in 1980, but his questioning of the factual accuracy of Orwell's first-person writings led to conflict with Brownell, and she tried to suppress the book. Crick concentrated on the facts of Orwell's life rather than his character, and presented primarily a political perspective on Orwell's life and work.

After Sonia Brownell's death, other works on Orwell were published in the 1980s, particularly in 1984. These included collections of reminiscences by Audrey Coppard and Crick and Stephen Wadhams.

In 1991, Michael Shelden, an American professor of literature, published a biography. More concerned with the literary nature of Orwell's work, he sought explanations for Orwell's character and treated his first-person writings as autobiographical. Shelden introduced new information that sought to build on Crick's work. Shelden speculated that Orwell possessed an obsessive belief in his failure and inadequacy.

Peter Davison's publication of the Complete Works of George Orwell, completed in 2000, made most of the Orwell Archive accessible to the public. Jeffrey Meyers, a prolific American biographer, was first to take advantage of this and published a book in 2001 that investigated the darker side of Orwell and questioned his saintly image. Why Orwell Matters (released in the United Kingdom as Orwell's Victory) was published by Christopher Hitchens in 2002.

In 2003, the centenary of Orwell's birth resulted in biographies by Gordon Bowker and D. J. Taylor, both academics and writers in the United Kingdom. Taylor notes the stage management which surrounds much of Orwell's behaviour and Bowker highlights the essential sense of decency which he considers to have been Orwell's main motivation. An updated edition of Taylor's biography is set to be published in 2023.

In 2018, Ronald Binns published the first detailed study of Orwell's years in Suffolk, Orwell in Southwold. In 2020, Professor Richard Bradford wrote a new biography, entitled Orwell: A Man of Our Time while in 2021 Rebecca Solnit reflected on what gardening may have meant to Orwell and what it means to gardeners everywhere, in her book Orwell’s Roses.

There are also biographies in other languages, for example in Russian.

Bibliography

Novels
 1934 – Burmese Days
 1935 – A Clergyman's Daughter
 1936 – Keep the Aspidistra Flying
 1939 – Coming Up for Air
 1945 – Animal Farm
 1949 – Nineteen Eighty-Four

Nonfiction
 1933 – Down and Out in Paris and London
 1937 – The Road to Wigan Pier
 1938 – Homage to Catalonia

Notes

References

Sources

 Anderson, Paul (ed.). Orwell in Tribune: 'As I Please' and Other Writings. Methuen/Politico's 2006. 
 Azurmendi, Joxe (1984): George Orwell. 1984: Reality exists in the human mind, Jakin, 32: 87–103.
 Bounds, Philip. Orwell and Marxism: The Political and Cultural Thinking of George Orwell. I.B. Tauris. 2009. 
 Bowker, Gordon. George Orwell. Little Brown. 2003. 
 Buddicom, Jacintha. Eric & Us. Finlay Publisher. 2006. 
 Caute, David. Dr. Orwell and Mr. Blair, Weidenfeld & Nicolson. 
 Crick, Bernard. George Orwell: A Life. Penguin. 1982. 
 Davison, Peter; Angus, Ian; Davison, Sheila (eds.). 2000 A Kind of Compulsion. London: Random House  
 Flynn, Nigel. George Orwell. The Rourke Corporation, Inc. 1990. 
 Haycock, David Boyd. I Am Spain: The Spanish Civil War and the Men and Women who went to Fight Fascism. Old Street Publishing. 2013. 
 Hitchens, Christopher. Why Orwell Matters. Basic Books. 2003. 
 Hollis, Christopher. A Study of George Orwell: The Man and His Works. Chicago: Henry Regnery Co. 1956.
 Larkin, Emma. Secret Histories: Finding George Orwell in a Burmese Teashop. Penguin. 2005. 
 Lee, Robert A. Orwell's Fiction. University of Notre Dame Press, 1969. 
 Leif, Ruth Ann. Homage to Oceania. The Prophetic Vision of George Orwell. Ohio State U.P. [1969]
 Meyers, Jeffery. Orwell: Wintry Conscience of a Generation. W.W. Norton. 2000. 
 Newsinger, John. Orwell's Politics. Macmillan. 1999. 
 .
 
 Rodden, John (ed.). The Cambridge Companion to George Orwell. Cambridge. 2007. 
 Shelden, Michael. Orwell: The Authorized Biography. HarperCollins. 1991. 
 Smith, D. & Mosher, M. Orwell for Beginners. 1984. London: Writers and Readers Publishing Cooperative.
 Taylor, D. J. Orwell: The Life. Henry Holt and Company. 2003. 
 West, W. J. The Larger Evils. Edinburgh: Canongate Press. 1992.  (Nineteen Eighty-Four – The truth behind the satire.)
 West, W. J. (ed.). George Orwell: The Lost Writings. New York: Arbor House. 1984. 
 Williams, Raymond. Orwell, Fontana/Collins, 1971
 Wood, James. "A Fine Rage." The New Yorker. 2009. 85(9):54.
 Woodcock, George. The Crystal Spirit. Little Brown. 1966.

Further reading
 Morgan, W. John, 'Pacifism or Bourgeois Pacifism? Huxley, Orwell, and Caudwell'. Chapter 5 in Morgan, W. John and Guilherme, Alexandre (Eds.), Peace and War-Historical, Philosophical, and Anthropological Perspectives, Palgrave Macmillan, 2020, pp, 71–96. .
 Orwell, George. Diaries, edited by Peter Davison (W. W. Norton & Company; 2012) 597 pages; annotated edition of 11 diaries kept by Orwell, from August 1931 to September 1949.
 
 Ostrom, Hans and Halton, William. Orwell's "Politics and the English Language" in the Age of Pseudocracy (New York: Routledge, 2018) 
 Wilson, S. M. and Huxtable, J. "Such, Such Were the Joys: graphic novel" (London: Pluto Press, Sept 2021)

External links

 Blair, Eric Arthur (George Orwell) (1903–1950) at the Oxford Dictionary of National Biography
 George Orwell at the British Library

Works:
 
 
 
 The complete works of George Orwell (george-orwell.org), a fan site

Catalogs and collections:
 
 
 Orwell Papers at University College London
 Orwell Collection (rare and early editions of Orwell's works) at University College London

 
1903 births
1950 deaths
20th-century atheists
20th-century British journalists
20th-century British novelists
20th-century British poets
20th-century deaths from tuberculosis
20th-century English historians
20th-century English male writers
20th-century English non-fiction writers
20th-century English novelists
20th-century English philosophers
20th-century English poets
20th-century essayists
20th-century poets
20th-century pseudonymous writers
Administrators in British Burma
Anti-Stalinist left
Aphorists
Atheist philosophers
British anti-communists
British anti-fascists
British Anti-Francoists
Indian Police Service officers in British India
British ethicists
British people of the Spanish Civil War
British Home Guard soldiers
British investigative journalists
British male essayists
British male journalists
British opinion journalists
British people in colonial India
British people of World War II
British propagandists
British secularists
British shooting survivors
British writers in French
Burials in Oxfordshire
Constructed language creators
Critics of Christianity
Critics of religions
Critics of the Catholic Church
Democratic socialists
English anti-fascists
English atheists
English booksellers
English critics
English democracy activists
English essayists
English humanists
English male journalists
English male non-fiction writers
English memoirists
English people of French descent
English political writers
English reporters and correspondents
English satirists
English sceptics
English social commentators
English socialists
English war correspondents
European democratic socialists
Foreign volunteers in the Spanish Civil War
Free speech activists
Freethought writers
Futurologists
Historians of fascism
Hugo Award-winning writers
Irony theorists
Journalists from Bihar
Literacy and society theorists
Literary theorists
Male essayists
Mass media theorists
Modernist writers
Neologists
Novelists from Bihar
People educated at Eton College
People educated at St Cyprian's School
People educated at Wellington College, Berkshire
People from Henley-on-Thames
People from Motihari
People from Shiplake
Philosophers of culture
Philosophers of education
Philosophers of history
Philosophers of language
Philosophers of literature
Philosophers of social science
Philosophers of war
Poets from Bihar
Political philosophers
Rhetoric theorists
Secular humanists
Social commentators
Social philosophers
Theorists on Western civilization
Tuberculosis deaths in England
Writers about activism and social change
Writers about communism